Tartan Track is a trademarked all-weather synthetic track surfacing made of polyurethane used for track and field competitions, manufactured by 3M. It lets athletes compete in bad weather without serious performance loss and improves their results over other surfaces. It also provides a more consistent surface for competition even under optimum weather. Such tracks have become the standard for most elite competitions.  

Because the "Tartan" brand name was the first and was widely successful in its time, the name Tartan has been used as a genericized trademark for description of an all-weather running track.

History 
The 1968 Summer Olympics at Mexico City was the first Olympic Games to use the Tartan track surface in athletics.  Olympic shot put champion Bill Nieder and American record holder in the mile Don Bowden were instrumental in developing the product and selling it for use in the 1968 Olympics.

American track and field coach Bert Bonanno, who had been recruited by the Mexican Olympic Committee to help prepare their athletes, worked as a liaison between the Mexican officials and manufacturer 3M in 1968.  “It had been red cinder at the Olympic Games up until then. 3M hired Jesse Owens to assist them to convince the Mexican Olympic Committee to put that track in,” Bonanno said.

A Tartan track was constructed for the men's U.S. Olympic Trials at Echo Summit, California, west of South Lake Tahoe.

The original trade name "Tartan" came from 3M, manufacturers of Scotch Tape and continuing the Scotch name tradition. 3M's first generation artificial turf of the late 1960s and early 1970s was branded as "Tartan Turf." Those original tracks required mercury as a catalyst, later found to be an environmental hazard.  An independent company has perfected the process without mercury.  There are now numerous competitors in the "all-weather track" industry.  In fact, the "Tartan" tracks of the late 1960s were the second generation of all-weather track surfacing.  Before that, there were several tracks constructed of rubber (usually tire shavings) and asphalt.  The first recorded use of a Tartan Track surface in competition in England was a long jump at the Norman Green Sports Centre in Solihull, September 16, 1967, though there were earlier uses in the United States.

See also

References

External links
 TartanTrack.com

Sport of athletics terminology
3M brands